Şerafettin Mağmumi (1860–1931) was an Ottoman intellectual and physician. He was one of the original founders of the Committee of the Ottoman Union.

References 

1860 births
1931 deaths
Physicians from Istanbul
Politicians of the Ottoman Empire
19th-century physicians from the Ottoman Empire
20th-century physicians from the Ottoman Empire